James Macpherson Grant (1822 – 1 April 1885) 
was an Australian solicitor who defended the Eureka Stockade rebels and a politician who was a member of the Victorian Legislative Assembly and the Victorian Legislative Council.

Early life and legal career
Grant was born at Alvie, Inverness-shire, Scotland, son of Louis Grant and his wife Isabella, née McBean. He obtained some schooling at Kingdenie and emigrated to Sydney with his parents in 1836 and was articled to Chambers and Thurlow, solicitors. In 1844 he paid a visit to New Zealand and served as a volunteer in the Flagstaff War against the Māoris. Returning to Australia he was admitted to practise as an attorney and solicitor in 1847, and became a partner of Mr Thurlow. In 1850, with a partner, he chartered a vessel and took supplies to California, and in June 1851 was still at San Francisco. Grant returned to Australia on receiving news of the discovery of gold in Victoria and in 1853 was a successful miner at Bendigo, Victoria. He was practising as a solicitor at Melbourne in 1854, and showed much sympathy for the diggers (miners) at the time of the Eureka rebellion in December 1854. The mayor of Melbourne, John Thomas Smith, had called a meeting at the town hall to concert measures for keeping law and order. Grant and Dr J. H. Owens issued a placard asking the public not to go to the town hall, but to attend an open-air meeting on the present site of St Paul's Cathedral, Melbourne. About 5000 people attended. Grant was one of the speakers and a committee was appointed to interview the governor. At the trial of the Ballarat miners Grant acted as their attorney without fee.

Political career
In 1855 Grant was elected a member of the Victorian Legislative Council for Sandhurst, and when responsible government was established in 1856, was elected a member of the Legislative Assembly for Sandhurst Boroughs (based around current Bendigo). Grant did not stand at the 1859 Sandhurst Boroughs election, but, in October 1959, was elected for Avoca and held this seat until his death. Grant joined the Richard Heales ministry in February 1861 as vice-president of the board of land and works and commissioner of public works, and resigned with Heales in November. Grant was commissioner for railways in the James McCulloch ministry from June 1863 to September 1864 and then became president of the board of lands and works and commissioner of crown lands and survey from September 1864 to May 1868. In 1865 Grant succeeded in passing a land act which promised to be little more successful than previous acts, the conditions being too exacting for poor men. One clause, however, which had been meant to apply to goldfield areas, allowed selectors to take up  at a rental of two shillings an acre. Grant was then holding the same position in the second McCulloch ministry as in the previous one, and went out of office in September 1869. The act, however, came into force on 1 February 1870 and, though amended by later governments, was the basis of all subsequent land settlement in Victoria. Grant earned great popularity from it, and was afterwards presented with a testimonial of £3000 raised by public subscription. He again held the lands portfolio in the Charles Duffy ministry from June 1871 to June 1872, was minister of justice in the first Graham Berry ministry for a few weeks in 1875, held the same position in the second Berry ministry from May 1877 to March 1880, and was chief secretary and minister of public instruction in the Bryan O'Loghlen ministry from July 1881 to March 1883. He was able to do valuable work at the education department by insisting on the importance of merit in considering promotions. Grant had a stroke of paralysis in November 1884 and died on 1 April 1885, leaving a widow, a son and three daughters. Grant was buried in Melbourne General Cemetery after a service at Elsternwick Presbyterian Church. A grant of £4000 was subsequently voted by parliament to his family.

Grant was regarded as having a genial nature and was generally liked. Although not a great orator, Grant had a clear grasp of questions which commanded attention and was also a thorough and hard-working administrator. His land act cleared up what seemed to be an almost hopeless position, and had great influence in the development of Victoria.

References

Geoffrey Bartlett, 'Grant, James Macpherson (1822–1885)', Australian Dictionary of Biography, Volume 4, MUP, 1972, pp 283–284. Retrieved 21 April 2013

1822 births
1885 deaths
Members of the Victorian Legislative Council
Members of the Victorian Legislative Assembly
Australian solicitors
Scottish emigrants to colonial Australia
19th-century Australian politicians
Burials at Melbourne General Cemetery
People from Badenoch and Strathspey